Ixora nigerica is a species of flowering plant in the family Rubiaceae. It is found in west tropical Africa.

References

External links
World Checklist of Rubiaceae

nigerica
Flora of Nigeria
Vulnerable plants
Taxonomy articles created by Polbot
Taxa named by Ronald William John Keay